The sixth Inter-Cities Fairs Cup was played over the 1963–64 season. The competition was won by Zaragoza in a one-off final at Camp Nou in Barcelona against fellow Spaniards and defending champions Valencia. There was only one representative city team, from Copenhagen, with established sides filling all the other slots.

First round 

|}
1 Lausanne-Sport won 3–2 after extra time in a play-off to advance to the second round.
2 Juventus won 1–0 in a play-off to advance to the second round.

First leg

Second leg 

Valencia won 3–2 on aggregate.

OFK Beograd 3–3 Juventus on aggregate.

Juventus won 1–0 in play-off.

Lokomotiv Plovdiv won 5–2 on aggregate.

Roma won 5–1 on aggregate.

Second round 

|}

First leg

Second leg 

Juventus won 3–1 on aggregate.

Roma won 3–1 on aggregate.

Quarter-finals 

|}
3 RFC Liegeois won 1–0 in a play-off in Liège to advance to the semi-finals.

First leg

Second leg 

Real Zaragoza won 3–2 on aggregate.

Köln won 5–3 on aggregate.

Semi-finals 

|}
4 Zaragoza won 2–0 in a play-off in Zaragoza to advance to the final.

Final

References

External links 
 1963–64 Inter-Cities Fairs Cup results at Rec.Sport.Soccer Statistics Foundation

Europa
Inter-Cities Fairs Cup seasons